Molana Malek Deylami (1518 in Qazvin - 1562 in Qazvin) was a Persian scrivener and calligrapher in the 16th century. He was a skillful Nastaliq calligrapher, who wrote bold and fine script skillfully.

Biography 
His first teacher was his father Shohreh Amir, who taught him Thuluth and Naskh. Later, when Rostam Ali Khorassani and Hafez Baba Jan went to Qazvin, he learnt Nastaliq from them. It is said that Malek Deilami was a student of Mir Ali Heravi or at least he drilled a lot from Heravi's works.
Molana Malek was the teacher of the Safavid prince, Abolfazl Soltan Ibrahim Mirza. Ibrahim Mirza, who was Bahram Mirza's son and Sam Mirza's nephew, was an art lover from the house of Safavids. He was not an ambitious man and because of it he was favorite of Tahmasp I. Ibrahim Mirza married to the Shah's daughter, Gohar Solatn, in 1556. He was appointed governor of Mashhad, where was the living and burial place of his father. He took Molana Malek as the painting teacher and curator of his library to Mashhad, but after 3 or 4 years he was called back to Qazvin by Tahmasp I for writing and inscription on the new royal building. This event shouldn't be later than 1561. In this time, he was writing the manuscript of Jami's Haft Awrang, which became one of the most famous manuscripts. This manuscript is kept in Freer Gallery of Art in Washington D. C. Writing this book with its 28 miniatures took 9 years and Deylami's successors like Moheb Ali Neynavaz Heravi, Rostam Ali and Molana Eyshi Heravi and Shah Mahmoud Neishabouri finished the calligraphy of the book. Malek was the companion of the Safavid Shah in Qazvin until death and he was buried in this city.

His students 
Mir Emad, the greatest Nastaliq calligrapher in the history, learnt Nastaliq from Malek Deylami for a while.

His other notable students were:
 Mohammad Hossein Tabrizi
 Soltan Ibrahim Mirza

References 

People from Qazvin
16th-century calligraphers of Safavid Iran
1518 births
1562 deaths
16th-century Iranian painters